Agustin Zaragoza Reyna (born 18 August 1941 in San Luis Potosi, Mexico) is a Mexican boxer.

He competed for Mexico in the 1968 Summer Olympics held in Mexico City, Mexico in the middleweight event where he finished in third place.

Notes

References

External links
 

1941 births
Boxers from San Luis Potosí
Olympic boxers of Mexico
Olympic bronze medalists for Mexico
Boxers at the 1968 Summer Olympics
Living people
Olympic medalists in boxing
Mexican male boxers
Medalists at the 1968 Summer Olympics
Boxers at the 1967 Pan American Games
Boxers at the 1971 Pan American Games
Pan American Games medalists in boxing
Pan American Games bronze medalists for Mexico
Middleweight boxers
Medalists at the 1967 Pan American Games